Raimondo Fassa (born 18 July 1959) is an Italian lawyer, professor and politician who served as Mayor of Varese (1993–1997) and member of the European Parliament (1994–1999).

References

1959 births
Living people
Mayors of Varese
People from Busto Arsizio
Lega Nord politicians